Uralsky Sledopyt (Ural Pathfinder) is a Soviet and Russian magazine dedicated to tourism and local history. It also has a science fiction section. It is printed in Yekaterinburg (formerly Sverdlovsk), Russia, located on the eastern side of the Ural mountain range, hence the name of the magazine.

In 1981 the magazine established the Aelita Prize for science fiction.

References

External links
Archive 1966-1990

1958 establishments in the Soviet Union
History magazines
Local interest magazines
Magazines established in 1958
Yekaterinburg
Russian-language magazines
Science fiction magazines published in Russia
Magazines published in the Soviet Union
Soviet science fiction
Tourism magazines